Sukhliya (formerly known as Sukhliya Gram or Gram Sukhliya, is a residential and commercial suburb located in the city of Indore, Madhya Pradesh. Situated next to Mangaliya (MR10 Road as well) and before Vijay Nagar.

Postal Code: 452010

Sukhliya remained as a rural region before 1990s, it was further developed by the Indore Municipal Corporation and the Indore Development Authority as a major and developed suburb. With major roads such as MR10, Airport Road, Indore-Ujjain Road passing through Sukhliya, it grew as a commercial as well as residential locality.

Colonies and Societies 

Sukhliya consists of following colonies/societies:
(In decreasing order of population)
 Heera/Hira Nagar
 Nyay Nagar
 Sunder Nagar Main
 Pandit Deendayal Upadhyay Nagar
 Shyam Nagar
 Shyam Nagar-NX (Extension)
 CM-I, II, III
 Kabir Khedi
 Swasthya Nagar
 Sanskriti Nagar/Ma-Sharda Nagar
 Royal Bungalow City
 Shalimar Bungalow Park
 Maruti Nagar
 Veena Nagar
 Gauri Nagar
 Prime City
 DDU (Dindayal Upadhyay Nagar

All cases/legalities within the locality of Sukhliya comes under Heera/Hira Nagar Thana (Heera Nagar Police Station), Heera Nagar, Sukhliya.

Nearby Suburbs 

 Vijay Nagar
 Mangaliya
 Scheme Numbers 78, 74, 54
 Patnipura/Pardeshipura

References 

Suburbs of Indore
Neighbourhoods in Indore